Jonathan Ryan Quinn (born February 27, 1975) is an American football coach and former player. He played professionally as a quarterback in the National Football League (NFL) with the Jacksonville Jaguars, Kansas City Chiefs and Chicago Bears. He was selected with the 25th pick of the third round of the 1998 NFL Draft out of Middle Tennessee State University by the Jaguars. Quinn served as the head football coach at MidAmerica Nazarene University in Olathe, Kansas from 2009 to 2013.

College career
Quinn transferred to Middle Tennessee State after one year at Tulane University.  He followed QB Kelly Holcomb after transferring.  His senior year numbers surpassed the numbers that Holcomb had put up his senior season.

1995: 108/223 for 1,742 yards with 8 TD vs 7 INT.
1996: 71/159 for 931 yards with 4 TD vs 9 INT.
1997: 167/293 for 2,209 yards with 16 TD vs 10 INT.

Professional career
After being drafted in 1998 by the Jacksonville Jaguars, he appeared in four games in 1998, two of them as the starting quarterback. The following year, had no appearances, and in 2000, Quinn made one appearance with no starts. 2001 saw him in 6 games before moving to Europe to play for the Berlin Thunder.

Quinn was the starting quarterback for the 2001 World Bowl champion Berlin Thunder of NFL Europe, where he was the league leading passer throwing for 2,247 yards, and was named World Bowl MVP.

In 2002-2003 Quinn was a member of the Kansas City Chiefs, made one appearance, but recorded no player stats. He spent a season with the Chicago Bears in 2004, playing in five games, with 3 starts, before ending his NFL career..

Quinn was signed by the Kansas City Brigade of the Arena Football League (AFL) during the 2006–2007 offseason, but retired due to injury.

Coaching career
From 2007 to 2008, Quinn was the offensive coordinator for MidAmerica Nazarene University (MNU) in Olathe, Kansas. On April 3, 2009, he was named as the head football coach for MidAmerica Nazarene.

In 2014 Quinn took a job as the head football coach at Davidson Academy, a K-12 school in Nashville, Tennessee.

References

1975 births
Living people
American football quarterbacks
Berlin Thunder players
Chicago Bears players
Jacksonville Jaguars players
Kansas City Chiefs players
Middle Tennessee Blue Raiders football players
Tulane Green Wave football players
MidAmerica Nazarene Pioneers football coaches
High school football coaches in Tennessee
World Bowl MVPs
People from Turlock, California
Players of American football from California